R C Stevens (July 22, 1934November 30, 2010) was a Major League Baseball first baseman. He was signed by the Pittsburgh Pirates before the 1952 season and traded to the Washington Senators on December 16, 1960. He played for the Pirates from 1958 to 1960, and for the Washington Senators in 1961.

Stevens was the first player to appear as a pinch hitter in modern Washington Senators history. On April 10, 1961, in the bottom of the ninth inning, he came into the game to bat for catcher Pete Daley against relief pitcher Frank Baumann. He hit a grounder to third, which advanced baserunner Jim Mahoney from first to second. The next batter made the third out, and the Washington Senators lost to the Chicago White Sox, 4–3.

Stevens had a lifetime batting average of .210, with eight home runs, 21 RBI, a slugging percentage of .395 in 210 at bats and scored 21 runs in 104 games. Defensively, Stevens committed only two errors in 426 total chances for a .995 fielding percentage in 388.1 innings at first base.

External links

 Retrosheet
Venezuelan Baseball League statistics

1934 births
2010 deaths
African-American baseball players
Baseball players from Georgia (U.S. state)
Batavia Clippers players
Burlington-Graham Pirates players
Columbus Jets players
Hollywood Stars players
Industriales de Valencia players
Major League Baseball first basemen
Pittsburgh Pirates players
Quad Cities Angels players
St. Jean Canadians players
Salt Lake City Bees players
Toronto Maple Leafs (International League) players
Washington Senators (1961–1971) players
20th-century African-American sportspeople
21st-century African-American people